Roz Kelly (born Rosiland Schwartz on July 29, 1943) is an American actress, perhaps best known for playing Arthur "Fonzie" Fonzarelli's (Henry Winkler) girlfriend Carol "Pinky" Tuscadero on the television series Happy Days.

Career
Before Happy Days, Roz Kelly worked as a staff photographer for New York Magazine, where she took pictures of both unknowns and celebrities, including Jimi Hendrix, Soupy Sales, Andy Warhol, Cream, Leonard Cohen, Neil Diamond, and photographer Diane Arbus.

On Happy Days, Kelly played Carol "Pinky" Tuscadero, the older sister of Leather Tuscadero (played by singer Suzi Quatro). Carol insisted on being called "Pinky," and usually dressed in attire to match. Pinky was slated to be Fonzie's long-term girlfriend after her initial appearances in episodes 64–66; commercials for the next season even began promoting the character. When discord occurred among Kelly, the cast, and producers, her character was dropped; she was only mentioned briefly in two later episodes.

Beyond Happy Days, Kelly reprised her Pinky role on the first episode of the short-lived 1977 Happy Days spin-off, Blansky's Beauties. She had a small but memorable role in the television thriller Curse of the Black Widow (1977), and portrayed Diane Sullivan in the slasher film New Year's Evil (1981). Kelly also appeared in guest roles on Starsky & Hutch, The Paul Lynde Halloween Special, Baretta, Kojak, The Love Boat, The Dukes of Hazzard, Charlie's Angels, and Fantasy Island. Her role in Starsky & Hutch was created when star Paul Michael Glaser (Starsky) planned to quit at the start of the third season, with Kelly's character, Officer Linda Baylor, intended to fill his place. However, Glaser was persuaded to stay, and Kelly's character appeared in three episodes, "Fatal Charm," “Las Vegas Strangler,” and “Death Notice.” Her role as Pinky Tuscadero was heavily promoted by ABC when the 1976 fall season began. She was billed as Roz "Pinky Tuscadero" Kelly for her appearance on The Paul Lynde Halloween Special in late October and appeared on Match Game PM the following week and later on Hollywood Squares.

Kelly also played roles in films such as Greetings (1968), The Owl and the Pussycat (1970), You've Got to Walk It Like You Talk It or You'll Lose That Beat (1971) and Full Moon High (1981), and had a voice role in the 1981 animated musical American Pop.

Kelly appeared as a guest on The Jenny Jones Show in an episode titled "Whatever Happened to Your Favorite Television Stars?"            Roz is now managed by Daniel Luongo

Personal life
Kelly was born in Mount Vernon, New York.

On November 29, 1998, she was arrested for firing a 12-gauge shotgun into the living room window of a neighbor's house after a car alarm woke her up; she also shot the neighbor's car and another car nearby. The neighbor was not home at the time. Pleading no contest to the charge of firing into the house, she received three years' felony probation on October 20, 2000. She was also ordered to receive psychiatric counseling and pay restitution as ordered by the probation department.

On October 27, 2000, she was sentenced to 120 days in jail after pleading "no contest" to charges stemming from an August 20, 2000, arrest for hitting a man with her cane. She was given credit for the 98 days that she had already spent in jail awaiting sentencing, thus avoiding having to spend any more time in jail.

References

External links
 
   Facebook Roz Kelly

1943 births
Living people
Actresses from New York (state)
American film actresses
American television actresses
Actors from Mount Vernon, New York
21st-century American women